Eric Rijk Kraan Osmanchuk (born December 10, 1971) is a Mexican business owner and former Mexico National Team speedskater. He resides in the US and is co-owner and co-CEO of the SkateNow Shop, a US-based speedskating equipment retailer. In 2017 he ran as a candidate for District 4, City Council in Cottonwood Heights, Utah; in 2021, he filed as a candidate for Mayor.

Mexico National Team Speedskater
Kraan, was founder of, and represented Mexico between 2000 and 2006 on the national long track ice speedskating team, and competed in international world cups. He set and still holds most of Mexico's national records. Eric also coached ice speed skating, and held a USS level II coaching certification.

Inline Skating
Kraan and his wife, Kimberly are both Skate Instructors Association certified instructors, run the SkateNow Skate School and the skateNOW, inc., shop (an ice and inline specialty sports equipment shop), to help promote the sports of inline speed skating and ice speedskating in Salt Lake City, and throughout the United States. The skate school and retail shop opened its doors in 2001.  They have mapped out and rated paved park pathways, and cycling lanes along roadways in the Greater Salt Lake area according to difficulty and safety.  Through their shop, skateNOW, inc the two support and promote both ice and inline sports though organization and sponsorship of: ice and inline racing events, conducting skating clinics, social fun rolls, participation in community events, and seasonal skate tours.

Notes

Mexican male speed skaters
Sportspeople from Mexico City
Living people
University of Texas at El Paso alumni
1971 births